Nick Sweeney (born 26 March 1968 in Dublin) is a retired Irish discus thrower, who represented his native country in four consecutive Summer Olympics, starting 1992 (Barcelona, Spain). He is the current Irish national record holder in the discus (67.89 m), and won a total number of ten Irish national discus titles (1987, 1991–1997, 1999 & 2000). He finished 6th at the 1993 World Championships in Stuttgart.

Biography
Sweeney went to school in Wesley College, Dublin where he was introduced to athletics and discus throwing through the then P.E. coach Dan Kennedy. Sweeney showed promise early on and eventually became the Irish schools record holder at senior level. After finishing his school studies he took a year out before traveling to the United States, to Harvard College where he completed a four-year degree.

As an athlete, Sweeney was affiliated to DSD AC, Dublin and Belgrave Harriers, Wimbledon (in England).

He presently lives and works in Boston, USA.

Achievements

References

External links
 Profile

1968 births
Living people
Irish male discus throwers
Athletes (track and field) at the 1992 Summer Olympics
Athletes (track and field) at the 1996 Summer Olympics
Athletes (track and field) at the 2000 Summer Olympics
Athletes (track and field) at the 2004 Summer Olympics
Olympic athletes of Ireland
Universiade medalists in athletics (track and field)
Sportspeople from Dublin (city)
Harvard College alumni
Universiade bronze medalists for Ireland
People educated at Wesley College, Dublin
Medalists at the 1993 Summer Universiade